Michael Kelsey "Kim" Elgie (born 6 March 1933) is a former South African cricketer who played in three Test matches in the 1961–62 series against New Zealand. He was also a rugby union footballer, who played for Scotland eight times as a centre while he was studying at the University of St Andrews in the 1950s.

Elgie was educated at Michaelhouse before attending university in the United Kingdom. He hit his top first-class score of 162 not out for Natal against Border in the 1959–60 season in a match in which 38 wickets fell for 418 runs.

See also
 List of Scottish cricket and rugby union players

References

External links

1933 births
Living people
South Africa Test cricketers
South African cricketers
KwaZulu-Natal cricketers
Scottish rugby union players
Scotland international rugby union players
Alumni of the University of St Andrews
University of St Andrews RFC players
Alumni of Michaelhouse